Bourke is a town in the north-west of New South Wales, Australia.

 137 kilometres south of Barringun and the Queensland - New South Wales Border
 256 kilometres (159 mi) south of Cunnamulla
 454 kilometres (282 mi) south of Charleville

History

The location of the current township of Bourke on a bend in the Darling River is the traditional country of the Ngemba people.

The first European-born explorer to encounter the river was Charles Sturt in 1828 who named it after Sir Ralph Darling, Governor of New South Wales. Having struck the region during an intense drought and a low river, Sturt dismissed the area as largely uninhabitable and short of any features necessary for establishing reliable industry on the land.

It was not until the mid-1800s following a visit by colonial surveyor and explorer Sir Thomas Mitchell in 1835 that settlement of the area began. Following tensions with the local people Mitchell built a small stockade to protect his men and named it Fort Bourke after then Governor Sir Richard Bourke. This first crude structure became the foundation for a fledgling community with a small number of agricultural and livestock farms established in the region shortly afterwards. The area started to flourish when its location on the Darling River had it recognised as a key trade centre, linking the nearby outback agricultural industries with the east coast trade routes via the Darling River.

Bourke was surveyed for a town in 1869 and soon established itself as the outback trade hub of New South Wales with several transportation industries setting up branches in the town. By the 1880s, Bourke would host a Cobb & Co Coach Terminus, several paddle boat companies running the Darling and a bridge crossing the river that would allow for road transportation into the town.

Opened on 4 May 1883, the North Bourke Bridge was designed by J.H. Daniels and modified in 1895 and 1903 by E.M. de Burgh. Its construction was begun by David BailIie and completed by McCulloch and Company. The 1895 modifications led to improved designs for subsequent lift-span bridges. The bridge is the oldest moveable-span bridge in Australia and is the sole survivor of its type in New South Wales. It served for 114 years before being bypassed in 1997 when a new bridge carrying the Mitchell Highway was opened just downstream.

By 1885 Bourke would be accessible by rail, confirming its position as a major inland transport hub. Like many outback Australian townships, Bourke would come to rely on camels for overland transport, and the area supported a large Afghan community that had been imported to drive the teams of camels. A small Afghan mosque that dates back to the 1900s can be found within Bourke cemetery.

As trade moved away from river transport routes, Bourke's hold on the inland trade industry began to relax. Whilst no longer considered a trade centre, Bourke serves instead as a key service centre for the state's north western regions. In this semi-arid outback landscape, sheep farming along with some small irrigated cotton crops comprise the primary industry in the area today.

Bourke's traditional landholders endured a similar fate to indigenous people across Australia. Dispossessed of their traditional country and in occasional conflict with white settlers, they battled a loss of land and culture and were hit hard by European disease. While the population of the local Ngemba and Barkindji people around the town of Bourke had dwindled by the late 19th century, many continued to live a traditional lifestyle in the region. Others found employment on local stations working with stock and found their skill as trackers in high demand.

A large influx of displaced Aboriginal peoples from other areas in the 1940s saw Bourke's indigenous community grow and led to the establishment of a reserve in 1946 by the Aborigines Protection Board. The majority of indigenous settlers were Wangkumara people from the Tibooburra region.

In 1962 in Perth, local high jumper Percy Hobson became the first person of Aboriginal descent to win a Commonwealth Games gold medal for Australia. Hobson was celebrated on his return to Bourke and greeted by a brass band playing "Hail the Conquering Hero". A park and illustrated water tower now contribute to his memory.

Heritage listings 

Bourke has a number of heritage-listed sites, including:
 3-7 Meek Street: St Ignatius Roman Catholic Church and Convent
 45 Mitchell Street: Towers Drug Company Building
 47 Oxley Street: Bourke Post Office
 Richard Street: Bourke Court House
 5 Richard Street: Ardsilla
 17 Sturt Street: Old London Bank Building
 The North Bourke Bridge, opened in 1883, is on the Engineering Heritage Register.

Population

In 2016, there were 1,824 people in Bourke.
 Aboriginal and Torres Strait Islander people made up 38.0% of the population. 
 78.1% of people were born in Australia and 80.2% spoke only English at home. 
 The most popular (40.2%) religion was Catholicism.

In Bourke today, there are 21 recognised indigenous language groups, including Ngemba, Barkindji, Wangkumara and Muruwari.

Climate 

Under the Köppen–Geiger classification, Bourke has a hot semi-arid climate (BSh) with a mild amount of rainfall throughout the year. On 4 January 1903, Bourke recorded a maximum temperature of 49.7 °C (121.5 °F), making it tied for the highest temperature recorded anywhere in New South Wales with Menindee, which is located further to the south, and one of the highest maximums ever to be recorded in Australia.

Education

Bourke has many schools for preschool children, primary and high school students. The Bourke–Walgett school of distance education allows children to be schooled at home, from preschool to year 12.

Transportation

Bourke can be reached by the Mitchell Highway from both the north from Cunnamulla and from the southeast from Nyngan. Brewarrina and Walgett are located on the Kamilaroi Highway that has its western terminus in Bourke. Moree and Goondiwindi, located on the Newell Highway, connect to Bourke via various roads. Cobar via the Kidman Way, is connected from the south.

The town is also served by Bourke Airport and has NSW TrainLink bus service to other regional centres such as Dubbo. It was formerly the largest inland port in the world for exporting wool on the Darling River. The Bourke court house is unique in inland Australia in that it was originally a maritime court and to this day maintains that distinction. That distinction is evident in the crowns that sits above the finials of the flag poles atop the corner parapets of the building.

Prior to its closure, Bourke railway station was the terminus of the Main Western railway line. The railway extension from Byrock opened on 3 September 1885.  Passenger services on the line were cancelled in September 1975 with the line closing down entirely in 1986, leaving the station derelict.

Cultural significance

Bourke is considered to represent the edge of the settled agricultural districts and the gateway to the outback that lies north and west of Bourke. This is reflected in a traditional east coast Australian expression "back o' Bourke" (from the poem by Scottish-Australian poet and bush balladeer Will H. Ogilvie.

The Tourist Information Centre is located on the Mitchell Highway at The Back 'O Bourke Exhibition Centre.

In 1892 a young writer Henry Lawson was sent to Bourke by the Bulletin editor J. F. Archibald to get a taste of outback life and to try to curb his heavy drinking. In Lawson's own words "I got £5 and a railway ticket from the Bulletin and went to Bourke. Painted, picked up in a shearing shed and swagged it for six months". The experience was to have a profound effect on the 25-year-old and his encounter with the harsh realities of bush life inspired much of his subsequent work. Lawson would later write "if you know Bourke you know Australia". In 1992 eight poems, written under a pseudonym and published in the Western Herald, were discovered in the Bourke library archives and confirmed to be Lawson's work.

Bush poets Harry 'Breaker' Morant (1864–1902) and Will H. Ogilvie (1869–1963) also spent time in the Bourke region and based much of their work on the experience.

Eye surgeon Fred Hollows was buried in Bourke after his death in 1993. Fred Hollows had worked at Enngonia and around the Bourke area in the early 1970s and had asked to be buried there.

The Telegraph Hotel, established in 1888 beside the Darling River, has been restored and now operates as the Riverside Motel.

Crime
In 2008, persistently high levels of criminal offending in Bourke led to a ban of the takeaway sales of beer in glass bottles, fortified wine larger than 750 mL and cask wine larger than two litres with only 3.5% or less alcohol non-glass bottles being sold midday. In 2013, a US-style justice reinvestment program called Maranguka was put in place to combat offending.

By 2017, there had been a 38% reduction in significant juvenile charges in Bourke. However, by 2022 crime in Bourke had again increased which the founder of Maranguka attributed to the COVID-19 pandemic.

In February 2022, ABC Radio's national current affairs program The World Today detailed numerous allegations of local health workers being routinely abused, threatened and attacked by patients at Bourke Hospital. Such incidents led the University of Sydney to suspend student nurse placements in Bourke.

A lead organiser with the New South Wales Nurses and Midwives' Association said the violence against health workers in Bourke was emblematic of the issues facing such staff in remote areas.  She claimed administration staff from the front office were being called on to check on patients in the aged care wing because there was an insufficient number of nurses.  She believed the patients at the hospital were being neglected due to a lack of staff with just two registered nurses responsible for the emergency department, an acute ward, an aged care wing and a COVID ward during a night shift.  She feared a nurse could lose their life through the violence, or that a patient could die through the chronic staffing shortages.

Bourke Shire mayor Barry Hollman expressed concern for the ramifications for the hospital if the ongoing violence prompted health workers to refuse to come to Bourke.  He said he was devastated by the level of violence in the town, which had shocked the community.

In a statement, Western New South Wales Local Health District chief executive Mark Spittal said his organisation had a zero tolerance of threatening or criminal behaviour and was working with Bourke Shire Council, various agencies and community leaders to address the issues.  Spittal said a number of measures had already been established including a 24/7 security presence and improvements to infrastructure such as lighting with further measures expected to be put in place in the near future.

Media

The town is served by nine FM and three AM radio stations, and five television channels.

The commercial radio stations are Flow FM, Rebel FM and The Breeze. Flow FM broadcasts on 102.5 FM (MHz), Rebel FM broadcasts on 104.9 FM (MHz) and The Breeze broadcasts on 107.3 FM (MHz) from Mt Oxley, Bourke. Both Rebel and Breeze stations are part of the Rebel Media group. ABC radio broadcasts on both the FM and AM bands and is pivotal to maintaining rural and community ties in the area.

There are three community radio stations based in Bourke. 2WEB broadcasts with 10,000 watts on 585 AM. 2CUZ is the Indigenous radio station on 106.5 FM. Gold FM is the tourist info station on 88.0 FM. The first two stations broadcast to a myriad of communities in the region.

The local paper, The Western Herald, is published on a weekly basis (every Thursday) year-round, except during a short break at Christmas.

Gallery

See also

 List of disasters in Australia by death toll for the 1895–1896 heat wave that killed 47 in Bourke

References

External links

Bourke Shire Council website
Bourke Tourism Information website
Bourke and district tourist attractions
2WEB   – "The Voice of the Outback" – community radio station

 
Towns in New South Wales
Populated places on the Darling River
River ports of Australia
Far West (New South Wales)
Bourke Shire